Halkar is a village in Kumta Taluk, Uttara Kannada, Karnataka, India.

Demographics 
In the 2011 census its population was 1079. Halkar Local Language is Kannada. Halkar Village Total population is 1079 and number of houses are 262. Female Population is 47.5%. Village literacy rate is 74.6% and the Female Literacy rate is 32.3%.

References

Villages in Uttara Kannada district